Supernova is an album by The Echoing Green. It primarily features brand-new material, along with a few reworked tracks from previous recordings.

Track listing
 "Supernova" (Joey Belville, Jerome Fontamillas, Jesse Dworak) – 5:26
 "Yesterday's Taking Over" (Belville) – 3:32
 "She's Gone Tragic" new version (Belville, Dworak) – 4:21
 "Liberation" (Belville, Chrissy Franklin, David Adams, Dworak) – 4:52
 "Waterfall" (Belville, Fontamillas) – 5:02
 "Thief" new version (Belville, Franklin, Adams) – 4:14
 "December" (Belville, Dworak) – 4:35
 "Jubilation (This Thing Called Life)" (Claude S.) – 4:53
 "Defender" new version (Belville, Adams) – 4:13
 "Nightfall & Splendor" (Jyro Xhan) – 5:51

Credits 
 Joey Belville – vocals, programming
 Chrissy Franklin – vocals
 Jesse Dworak – programming
 David Adams – drums, programming
 Kevin Robinson – guitar
 Micah Ortega – turntables
 Marsh Shaumburger – acoustic guitar on "She's Gone Tragic"
 Tresa Jordan – backing vocals on "Nightfall & Splendor"

References

2000 albums
The Echoing Green albums